Miranda Nicole Dodson (née, Skaggs; born December 5, 1980) is an American Christian musician and folk singer-songwriter, who primarily plays an alternative country, roots rock, and a worshipful style of music. She has released one studio album, Change a Thing, in 2010, and an extended play, Ascend, in 2014.

Early and personal life
Dodson was born Miranda Nicole Skaggs, on December 5, 1980, in Midland, Texas, the daughter of Timothy Bruce Skaggs and Jamie Leann Skaggs (née, Marks), while she went to college at the University of North Texas, graduating with her baccalaureate in Art Teacher Education. She resides in Austin, Texas, with her husband, Luke Dodson, and their three children, where they attend City Life Church, pastored by her brother-in-law.

Music career
Her music recording career started in 2010, by releasing a studio album, Change a Thing, on June 15, 2010. The subsequent release, an extended play, Ascend, was released on March 25, 2014.

Discography
Studio albums
 Change a Thing (June 15, 2010)
EPs
 Ascend (March 25, 2014)

References

External links
 Official website

1980 births
Living people
American performers of Christian music
Musicians from Austin, Texas
Songwriters from Texas